Mount Lyndhurst Important Bird Area comprises a 93 km2 part of Mount Lyndhurst Station, a pastoral lease lying on the north-west margin of the Flinders Ranges, about 30 km east of the town of Lyndhurst, South Australia.  It is accessible via the Strzelecki Track.

Description
The extent of the Important Bird Area (IBA) is defined as all habitat suitable for chestnut-breasted whitefaces on Mount Lyndhurst Station.  The habitat consists of low hills covered by gibber and shingle rock, forming a bare, stony surface dissected by numerous drainage lines. It also supports patches of low, open shrubland, mainly of low bluebush, bladder saltbush and other chenopods, with a sparse scattering of larger emu bushes and wattles.  The climate is arid with hot summers and mild, dry winters.  Mean maximum temperatures range from 35.5 °C in January to 17.3 °C in July.  Mean annual rainfall is 162 mm.

Criteria for nomination as an IBA
The site has been identified by BirdLife International as an IBA because it contains the largest known population of the chestnut-breasted whitefaces within the eastern part of its range.  It also supports populations of inland dotterels, thick-billed grasswrens, banded whitefaces, black and pied honeyeaters, gibberbirds, chirruping wedgebills and cinnamon quail-thrushes.

See also
List of birds of South Australia

References

Important Bird Areas of South Australia
Far North (South Australia)